"Ten Little Indians" is a traditional American children's counting out rhyme. It has a Roud Folk Song Index number of 12976. The term "Indians" in this sense refers to Indigenous North American peoples, with some adaptations referring to Indians as people of Sub-Saharan African ethnicity. In 1868, songwriter Septimus Winner adapted it as a song, then called "Ten Little Injuns", for a minstrel show.

Lyrics

The modern lyrics for the children's rhyme are:

Minstrel song
Songwriter Septimus Winner created an elaborated version of the children's song, called "Ten Little Injuns", in 1868 for a minstrel show.

Derivative songs and books

It is generally thought that this song was adapted, possibly by Frank J. Green in 1869, as "Ten Little Niggers", though it is possible that the influence was the other way around, with "Ten Little Niggers" being a close reflection of the text that became "Ten Little Indians". Either way, "Ten Little Niggers" became a standard of the blackface minstrel shows. It was sung by Christy's Minstrels and became widely known in Europe, where it was used by Agatha Christie in her novel of the same name, about ten killings on a remote island. The novel was later retitled  And Then There Were None (1939), and remains one of her most famous works. The Spanish and Russian titles of Christie's novel today are still Diez negritos and «Десять негритят», respectively, and the German children's song, with a different melody, is called "Zehn kleine Negerlein".

Variants of this song have been published widely as children's books; what the variants have in common is 'that they are about dark-skinned boys who are always children, never learning from experience'. For example, it had been published in the Netherlands by 1913; in Denmark by 1922 (in Börnenes billedbog); in Iceland in 1922 (as "Negrastrákarnir"); and in Finland in the 1940s (in Kotoa ja kaukaa: valikoima runosatuja lapsille and Hupaisa laskukirja). The Bengali poem "Haradhon er Dosti Chhele" ("Haradhon's Ten Sons") is also inspired by "Ten Little Indians".

Criticism of racist language
Because of changing sensibilities over the words used, modern versions for children often use "aeroplanes", "soldier boys" or "teddy bears" as the objects of the rhyme. Icelandic publisher Skrudda's unaltered republication in 2007 of the 1922 Icelandic version of Ten Little Negroes caused considerable debate in that country, with a strong division between those who saw the book as racist and those who saw it as "a part of funny and silly stories created in the past". In Kristín Loftsdóttir's assessment of the debate,

The republishing of the book in Iceland triggered a number of parodies or rewritings: Tíu litlír kenjakrakkar ("Ten little prankster-children") by Sigrún Eldjárn and Þórarinn Eldjárn; 10 litlir sveitastrákar ("Ten little country-boys") by Katrín J. Óskarsdóttir and Guðrún Jónína Magnúsdóttir; and Tíu litlir bankastrákar ("Ten little banker-boys") by Óttar M. Njorðfjörð.

1945 version
The following version of the song was included in the first film version of And Then There Were None (1945), which largely took Green's lyrics and replaced the already sensitive word "nigger" with "Indian" (in some versions "soldiers"):

See also
 Ten Green Bottles
 Ten Little Indians (Harry Nilsson song)

Notes

Sources

Bibliography 
"Reviews and Literary Notices", pp. 770–779, The Atlantic Monthly, vol. III (June 1859) no. XX, Boston: Phillips, Sampson, and Company.
Wilson, B. M. "John Brown's Ten Little Injuns" pp. 32–36, Wilson's Book of Drills and Marches for Young People and Small Children of Both Sexes. New York: Dick & Fitzgerald (1895).
Winner, Septimus. "Ten Little Injuns" (Sheet music). Boston: Oliver Ditson Company (1868).

External links
 

American nursery rhymes
American folk songs
Traditional children's songs
Songwriter unknown
1868 songs
Songs about Native Americans
Race-related controversies in music